The Way You Are may refer to:

"The Way You Are" (Fältskog and Håkansson song), a 1986 song by  Agnetha Fältskog and Ola Håkansson
"The Way You Are" (Tears for Fears song), a 1983 song by Tears for Fears
"The Way You Are" (Anti Social Media song), a 2015 song by Anti Social Media
"The Way You Are", a 1995 song by Lighthouse Family from Ocean Drive

See also
Just the Way You Are (disambiguation)
The Way I Are
The Way I Are (Dance with Somebody)